Rashid Mustafa is a Tabla player empanelled in the Indian Council for Cultural Relations in 2010 under the category Tabla for Hindustani classical music.
Mustafa was awarded the Thirakwa Award  by Bharatiya Vidya Bhavan in 1984 and also received the Crystal Award from Yehudi Menuhin in Davos, Switzerland.

Classical Training
He received early training in tabla under his father Mohammad Jan Thirakwa and then under his uncle Ustaad Ahmed Jan Thirakwa from Farukhabad Gharana of Hindustani music.

Live Performances
 'Parampara' presented by Parichay Foundation with performances from Padma Vibhushan Guru Hariprasad Chaurasia Ji With Ustad Rashid Mustafa Thirakwa at Sri Sathya Sai International Centre, Pragati Vihar, Lodhi Road, New Delhi 110003
 commonwealth games 2010, new delhi

Discography

Lehren = लेहरें-Talat Aziz (LP, Album) Music India, 1983
The Maestro's Musings -Amjad Ali Khan(LP) CBS, 1986
The Album-Amjad Ali Khan(CD, Comp) Sirocco 2, CBS, 1988
Sarod-Amjad Ali Khan Music today, 19991
Swar Sameer-Ustad Amjad Ali Khan (CD, Album) Super Cassettes Industries Ltd., T-Series , 1991
Music Of The Sitar-Pandit Partho Das JVC, 1992
Moods 'N' Melodies-Rachna Subhalakshmi and Rashid Mustafa and various, T-Series, SCI, 1992
Raga Bahar  - Instrumental Wizards (3xCD) -with Ustad Amjad Ali Khan, Sony Music, 2015

References

Indian musicians by instrument
Tabla players
Living people
Year of birth missing (living people)